Sam Bumatay (born February 12, 1999) is a Filipino actress. She was the Ultimate Female Survivor winner in Starstruck Kids, a reality-based talent search show in the Philippines, aired by GMA. She is now studying in University of Santo Tomas.

Career
Bumatay was product of GMA's StarStruck Kids talent contest. Bumatay won the Ultimate Female Survivor along with Kurt Perez as the Ultimate Male Survivor in 2004. She played as Lawiswis in Mulawin (2004), starring Angel Locsin, Richard Gutierrez and Dennis Trillo, among others. Bumatay played as the young robot in QTV 11 sitcom Ay, Robot! (2005) with Ogie Alcasid, Tanya Garcia, Ryza Cenon, C.J. Muere and Eunice Lagusad, directed by Al Tantay. In 2006, she was nominated as Best Child Actress in Mulawin: The Movie for FAMAS Awards and Star Awards For Movies.

Television

Filmography

References

External links

Living people
StarStruck Kids participants
Reality show winners
1999 births
Filipino child actresses
GMA Network personalities
Actresses from Manila
Tagalog people